The name Caloy has been used to name six tropical cyclones in the Philippine Area of Responsibility by PAGASA in the Western Pacific Ocean.

 Tropical Depression Caloy (2002) (03W, Caloy), traversed the Southern Philippines
 Typhoon Chanchu (2006) (T0601, 02W, Caloy), struck the Philippines and China
 Typhoon Chanthu (2010) (T1003, 04W, Caloy), struck the Philippines and China
 Tropical Depression Caloy (2014) (04W, Caloy), made landfall on Mindanao
 Typhoon Jelawat (2018) (T1803, 03W, Caloy), no land interaction
 Typhoon Chaba (2022) (T2203, 04W, Caloy), made landfall in southwestern Guangdong province, China; 26 people were killed when an offshore crane vessel split in half during the storm and sank

Pacific typhoon set index articles